Orovada is a census-designated place in Humboldt County, Nevada. The population was 155 at the 2010 census.

History
The first permanent settlement at Orovada was made in 1918. The name is a combination of oro (Spanish "gold") and Nevada. A post office has been in operation at Orovada since 1920.

Geography
U.S. Route 95 runs through the CDP, leading south  to Winnemucca and north  to the Oregon state line at McDermitt.

Education
The Humboldt County School District operates schools serving areas with Orovada addresses. Some areas are zoned to Orovada School, a K-8 school. Other areas are zoned to Kings River School, a K-8 school.

In 1954 the Orovada School had 22 students.  A new  building, designed by Alegre and Hanson and built by A.T. Costa, opened in 1958. The two classroom facility and two teacher apartment facilities were made of pumice. Orovada School had 50 students in the 1963-1964 school year. In 1966 some parents stated that the district needed a new heating system in the school and they would prevent their children from attending if this was not done.

Kings River School had 15 students in the 1963-1964 school year.

Notable person
Rodeo announcer Bob Tallman lived on Willow Creek Ranch, eight miles north of Orovada, during his early childhood.

Demographics

References

Census-designated places in Humboldt County, Nevada
Census-designated places in Nevada